Voicemail is a dancehall reggae fusion duo, hailing from Kingston, Jamaica.

Group members
Jerome Jackson (Qraig), Kevin Blair(Kevyn V) O'Neil Edwards (deceased)

History
Voicemail is a Dancehall, Reggae Fusion group that hails from the heart of Kingston in the beautiful island of Jamaica. The group have become synonymous with producing some of the best dance hits and boast a unique sound unlike any other in the island and the world.

It was at a talent show in 1999 that five likeminded young men met and from there decided to put their musical talents together to form the boy band "Voicemail".  The group then consisted of Robert Manning, Leonardo Grant (lead singer), Kevin Blair, Jerome Jackson and O’Neil Edwards who worked together until 2002.  With the road to success seemingly distant both Robert and Leonardo grew weary at little to no progress and decided to leave the group. 

The once Quintet now reduced to a Trio- Kevin, Jerome and O'Neil from the encouragement of others in the industry, family and close friends became even more determined to hold on to their dreams of success as they continued under the name Voicemail. It was from this sheer determination and commitment to practicing and owning their craft that they did their first recording as a Trio in 2003, a single called "Never Really Want to Let You Go" with popular radio disc jockey and producer Arif Cooper.

Since then, the group have gone on to record with producers such as Tony Kelly, Robert Livingston and Danny Champagne. It was not until 2004, however that they would get their first local hit in "Weddy Time" featuring Delly Ranks and well known Jamaican dancer Bogle the single was produced by Danny Champagne. Riding on this success, they went on to record a string of singles with accompanying videos such as, "She Want It Harder", “Weddy Time”, "Ready To Party", and "Wacky Dip".  

With their popularity steadily growing the group began performing at various events locally.  Featuring at Spring Fest 2004, Fully Loaded and at Reggae Sumfest in 2004 and 2005. Voicemail by now had cemented their name in Jamaican Music history as the group to watch with their ever-evolving dance routines, permissive lyrics and keen fashion sense.

On July 18th 2006, the group released their first album "Hey" with VP Records which was an overwhelming success as it sold heavily both locally and internationally. In 2007 they released a second album entitled "Let's Go" with a third following quickly after in 2008 called “Jump Off” both distributed by Japan's Pony Canyon Label. Their third album “Jump Off” went in a different direction as this contained no dance songs, for which the group had become synonymous. This however, did nothing to decrease their fame as their popularity grew even more. And they went on to headline several major shows in Japan including the largest reggae festival "Yokohama Reggae SAI". The group took the festival by storm and went on to perform extensively in the Caribbean, and amassed a large following in the United States and Europe. Solidifying their international status as dance floors most wanted and style icons in their own right.

The group was plunged into mourning as tragedy struck on the morning of May 9, 2010 when O'Neil Edwards was shot at his home in Duhaney Park. After undergoing emergency surgery, and fighting for two weeks O’Neil sadly succumbed to his injuries and passed away on May 26. Leaving behind family, friends and the remaining two group members who would have to carry on the Voicemail name.

From Quintet to Trio to Duo, Kevin and Jerome knew it was up to them keep the memory of their fallen brother alive through their music. With that at the forefront of their minds the now Duo in that same year left for Europe on a Tour that would be called “Tribute to O’Neil”.

In 2012 paying homage to O’Neil, the Duo along with Captivate Music released a free Album on Youtube entitled “Next Level” which featured their last recordings with O’Neil. As part of their continued commitment to carry on the Voicemail name, the Duo released a dance album entitled “Let’s Dance” in 2013 and toured Japan once again in 2014.  

No strangers to hard work the Duo released their second project together, an Ep entitled   “Gamechangers” produced by Dancehallrulerz in 2015 and toured the United States, the Caribbean and Europe bringing their high energy and style once again to the world stage. 

2016 and 2017 saw singles like “Weh deh pon yuh foot”, “I Wanna Dance”, “Waist a Move”, “Dancehall” and “My Team”.

The Duo continues to tour the World bringing their style, high energy and entrainment to every stage and continent they visit.

Discography

Albums

References

External links
[ Voice Mail at Allmusic.com]
Group of the Year - Voice Mail takes over Japan
Jamaican reggae fusion single "Dance the Night Away"

Jamaican reggae musical groups
Reggae fusion groups
Musical groups established in 2003
VP Records artists